This is a list of commercial Long-Term Evolution (LTE) networks in Asia, grouped by their frequency bands.

Some operators use multiple bands and are therefore listed multiple times in respective sections.

General information 
 For technical details on LTE and a list of its designated operating frequencies, bands, and roaming possibilities, see LTE frequency bands.

Note: This list of network deployments does not imply any widespread deployment or national coverage.

Commercial deployments

Deployments in the 3400–3800 MHz range

Commercial deployments (old table format)

See also 
 LTE
 LTE frequency bands
 List of LTE networks
 List of planned LTE networks
 List of UMTS networks
 List of HSPA+ networks
 List of CDMA2000 networks
 UMTS frequency bands
 List of mobile network operators of the Asia Pacific region
 Mobile Network Codes in ITU region 4xx (Asia)

References 

Asia-related lists
Lists by country
LTE (telecommunication)
Telecommunications lists